Jacques Édouard Quecq, a French historical painter, born at Cambrai in 1796, and died in 1874. He was a pupil of Steuben.  Among his works are:
First Combat of Romulus and Remus, 1827
Death of Vitellius, 1831
Death of Britannicus, 1833
After the Shipwreck, 1834
Saint Waast, 1838
Francis of Assisi, 1836
San Carlo Borromeo during the Plague at Milan, 1840
San Carlo Borromeo Administering the Viaticum to Pope Pius IV, 1842
Martin of Tours, 1846
Lais and Diogenes, 1850
Christ Fainting Under the Cross, 1861
Portrait of Louis XVIII

References

1796 births
1874 deaths
19th-century French painters
French male painters
People from Cambrai
19th-century French male artists
18th-century French male artists